Dr. Martin Luther King Jr. Expressway may refer to:

New York State Route 440
Interstate 65 in Kentucky
Interstate 110 (Louisiana)
Interstate 244

See also
List of streets named after Martin Luther King Jr.
Martin Luther King Jr. Boulevard (disambiguation)
Martin Luther King Jr. Drive (disambiguation)
Martin Luther King Jr. Parkway (disambiguation)
Martin Luther King Jr. Way (disambiguation)